Namo Narayana is an Indian actor who has worked in Tamil films. He made a breakthrough as an actor with his performances in Naadodigal (2009) and Komban (2015).

Career
Narayana was a software engineer before he chose to star in a supporting role in Samuthirakani's Naadodigal (2009). He was close friend of Samuthirakani during bachelor days. Post-release, he became a close friend of the lead actor Sasikumar, and has often collaborated in their films, such as Easan (2010), Poraali (2011), Kutti Puli (2013) and Nimirndhu Nil (2014). In 2015, Narayana described his role in Komban as a breakthrough role in his career at the film's press meet. He played one of the lead roles in Appa (2016). He played the antagonist in Thondan (2017).

Filmography

Naadodigal (2009)
Easan (2010)
Mudhal Idam (2010)
Poraali (2011)
Ishtam (2011)
Thappana - Malayalam (2012)
Kedi Billa Killadi Ranga (2012)
Kutti Puli (2013)
Kallapetty (2013)
Veeran Muthurakku (2014)
Nimirndhu Nil (2014)
Tenaliraman (2014)
Yaamirukka Bayamey (2014)
Bhaiyya Bhaiyya - Malayalam (2014)
Manam Konda Kadhal (2015)
Janda Pai Kapiraju - Telugu (2015)
Komban (2015)
Kaaval (2015)
Vaalu (2015)
Pasanga 2 (2015)
Metro (2016)
Rajini Murugan (2016)
Navarasa Thilagam (2016)
Marudhu (2016)
Appa (2016)
Vaaimai (2016)
Aandavan Kattalai (2016)
Kodi (2016)
Nagarvalam (2017)
Enga Amma Rani (2017)
Thondan (2017)
Podhuvaga Emmanasu Thangam (2017)
Hara Hara Mahadevaki (2017)
Guru Uchaththula Irukkaru (2017)
Asuravadham (2018)
Viswasam (2019)
Gurkha (2019)
 Dagaalty (2020)
Naadodigal 2 (2019)
Dharala Prabhu (2020)
Ka Pae Ranasingam (2020)
Pulikkuthi Pandi (2021)
Vettai Naai (2021)
Sulthan (2021)
Vinodhaya Sitham (2021)
Udanpirappe (2021)
MGR Magan (2021)
Raajavamsam (2021)
 Anandham Vilayadum Veedu (2021)
Kallan (2022)
Kaatteri (2022)
Pistha (2022)
Yugi (2022)
Naan Mirugamaai Maara (2022)
Kaari (2022)
Therkathi Veeran (2022)
Mr Daddy (2022)

Short Films 
 Uruvan

References

External links

Living people
Male actors in Tamil cinema
21st-century Indian male actors
Tamil male actors
Year of birth missing (living people)